Herľany is a village and municipality in Košice-okolie District in the Košice Region of eastern Slovakia.

History
In historical records, the village was first mentioned in 1487.

Geography
The village lies at an altitude of 365 metres and covers an area of 9.914 km².
It has a population of about 290 people.

Sights
The village is known for the only full-scale geyser in Slovakia, one of the few cold water geysers in the world. It erupts periodically (24–32 hours) and erupts water to the 10–15 m height since 1872. Eruption lasts around 25 minutes.

Genealogical resources

The records for genealogical research are available at the state archive "Statny Archiv in Kosice, Slovakia"

 Roman Catholic church records (births/marriages/deaths): 1755-1895 (parish B)
 Greek Catholic church records (births/marriages/deaths): 1788-1912 (parish B)
 Lutheran church records (births/marriages/deaths): 1775-1895 (parish B)

See also
 List of municipalities and towns in Slovakia
 Sivá Brada

References

External links
Surnames of living people in Herlany

Villages and municipalities in Košice-okolie District
Cold water geysers
Geysers in Slovakia